The 2011–12 New Jersey Nets season was the 45th season of the franchise, their 36th in the National Basketball Association (NBA), and their 35th and final season in New Jersey before moving to Brooklyn, New York and changing their name to the Brooklyn Nets for the 2012–13 season. The Nets finished 22–44, last in the Atlantic Division and 12th overall in the Eastern Conference and failed to make the playoffs for a fifth consecutive season. Point guard Deron Williams led the team in scoring (21.0), assists (8.7), and minutes per game (36.3) and was the team's lone selection in the 2012 NBA All-Star Game. Forward Kris Humphries led the team with 11.0 rebounds and 1.19 blocks per game and games played (62).

Key dates
 June 23: The 2011 NBA draft took place at Prudential Center in Newark, New Jersey.
 December 26: The regular season started with a victory against the Washington Wizards.
 April 23: The Nets play their final game in New Jersey against the Philadelphia 76ers.

Draft picks

Roster

Pre-season
Due to the 2011 NBA lockout negotiations, the programmed pre-season schedule, along with the first two weeks of the regular season were scrapped, and a two-game pre-season was set for each team once the lockout concluded.

|- bgcolor="#ffcccc"
| 1
| December 17
| New York
| 
| Brook LopezAnthony Morrow (15)
| Brook Lopez (11)
| Deron Williams (6)
| Prudential Center13,027
| 0–1
|- bgcolor="ffcccc"
| 2
| December 21
| @ New York
| 
| Deron Williams (21)
| Shelden WilliamsJohan Petro (10)
| Deron Williams (7)
| Madison Square Garden
| 0–2

Regular season

Standings

Record vs. opponents

Game log

|- style="background:#cfc;"
| 1
| December 26
| @ Washington
| 
| Deron Williams (23)
| Kris Humphries (16)
| Deron Williams (9)
| Verizon Center17,102
| 1–0
|- style="background:#fcc;"
| 2
| December 27
| Atlanta
| 
| Marshon Brooks (17)
| Kris Humphries (6)
| Sundiata Gaines (4)
| Prudential Center18,711
| 1–1
|- style="background:#fcc;"
| 3
| December 29
| @ Orlando
| 
| Marshon Brooks (17)
| Kris Humphries (10)
| Deron Williams (7)
| Amway Center18,954
| 1–2
|- style="background:#fcc;"
| 4
| December 30
| @ Atlanta
| 
| Deron Williams (23)
| Kris Humphries (13)
| Deron Williams (6)
| Philips Arena16,300
| 1–3

|- style="background:#fcc;"
| 5
| January 1
| @ Cleveland
| 
| Anthony Morrow (15)
| Mehmet Okur (8)
| Deron Williams (5)
| Quicken Loans Arena15,084
| 1–4
|- style="background:#fcc;"
| 6
| January 2
| Indiana
| 
| Deron Williams (22)
| Marshon Brooks (7)
| Deron Williams (8)
| Prudential Center12,519
| 1–5
|- style="background:#fcc;"
| 7
| January 4
| @ Boston
| 
| MarShon Brooks (17)
| Shelden Williams (9)
| Farmar & Gaines (6)
| TD Garden18,624
| 1–6
|- style="background:#cfc;"
| 8
| January 6
| @ Toronto
| 
| Morrow & D. Williams (24)
| Kris Humphries (16)
| Deron Williams (6)
| Air Canada Centre16,771
| 2–6
|- style="background:#fcc;"
| 9
| January 7
| Miami
| 
| Kris Humphries (25)
| Shelden Williams (13)
| Deron Williams (10)
| Prudential Center18,711
| 2–7
|- style="background:#fcc;"
| 10
| January 9
| Atlanta
| 
| Anthony Morrow (20)
| Marshon Brooks (10)
| Deron Williams (14)
| Prudential Center12,259
| 2–8
|- style="background:#fcc;"
| 11
| January 11
| @ Denver
| 
| Jordan Farmar (26)
| Kris Humphries (9)
| Deron Williams (13)
| Pepsi Center14,139
| 2–9
|- style="background:#cfc;"
| 12
| January 13
| @ Phoenix
| 
| Deron Williams (35)
| Mehmet Okur (7)
| Deron Williams (14)
| US Airways Center15,191
| 3–9
|- style="background:#fcc;"
| 13
| January 14
| @ Utah
| 
| Kris Humphries (18)
| Kris Humphries (10)
| Deron Williams (5)
| EnergySolutions Arena19,557
| 3–10
|- style="background:#fcc;"
| 14
| January 16
| @ L. A. Clippers
| 
| Marshon Brooks (19)
| Brooks & S. Williams (8)
| Jordan Farmar (7)
| Staples Center19,060
| 3–11
|- style="background:#cfc;"
| 15
| January 18
| Golden State
| 
| Monta Ellis (30)
| Kris Humphries (15)
| Deron Williams (10)
| Prudential Center
| 4–11
|- style="background:#fcc;"
| 16
| January 21
| Oklahoma City
| 
| Russell Westbrook (21)
| Kris Humphries (16)
| Deron Williams (6)
| Prudential Center
| 4–12
|- style="background:#cfc;"
| 17
| January 22
| Charlotte
| 
| MarShon Brooks (20)
| Kris Humphries (10)
| Deron Williams (10)
| Prudential Center
| 5–12
|- style="background:#fcc;"
| 18
| January 23
| @ Chicago
| 
| Richard Hamilton (22)
| Joakim Noah (10)
| Richard Hamilton (10)
| United Center
| 5–13
|- style="background:#cfc;"
| 19
| January 25
| @ Philadelphia
| 
| Deron Williams (34)
| Kris Humphries (19)
| Deron Williams (11)
| Wells Fargo Center
| 6–13
|- style="background:#cfc;"
| 20
| January 27
| @ Cleveland
| 
| Kyrie Irving (32)
| Kris Humphries (11)
| Deron Williams (10)
| Quicken Loans Arena
| 7–13
|- style="background:#fcc;"
| 21
| January 29
| Toronto
| 
| DeMar DeRozan (27)
| Shelden Williams (9)
| José Calderón (9)
| Prudential Center
| 7–14
|- style="background:#fcc;"
| 22
| January 31
| @ Indiana
| 
| Deron Williams (34)
| Roy Hibbert (14)
| Deron Williams (7)
| Bankers Life Fieldhouse
| 7–15

|- style="background:#cfc;"
| 23
| February 1
| Detroit
| 
| Deron Williams (26)
| Shelden Williams (11)
| Deron Williams (9)
| Prudential Center
| 8–15
|- style="background:#fcc;"
| 24
| February 3
| Minnesota
| 
| Anthony Morrow (42)
| Nikola Peković (11)
| Deron Williams (14)
| Prudential Center
| 8–16
|- style="background:#fcc;"
| 25
| February 4
| New York
| 
| Jeremy Lin (25)
| Kris Humphries (12)
| Deron Williams (11)
| Madison Square Garden
| 8–17
|- style="background:#fcc;"
| 26
| February 6
| Chicago
| 
| Deron Williams (25)
| Joakim Noah (12)
| CJ Watson (11)
| Prudential Center
| 8–18
|- style="background:#fcc;"
| 27
| February 8
| Detroit
| 
| Deron Williams (34)
| Kris Humphries (16)
| Deron Williams (7)
| Prudential Center
| 8–19
|- style="background:#fcc;"
| 28
| February 10
| @ Detroit
| 
| Jonas Jerebko (20)
| Greg Monroe (11)
| Sundiata Gaines (6)
| The Palace of Auburn Hills
| 8–20
|- style="background:#fcc;"
| 29
| February 11
| San Antonio
| 
| Deron Williams (27)
| Tim Duncan (10)
| Deron Williams (8)
| Prudential Center
| 8–21
|- style="background:#fcc;"
| 30
| February 15
| Memphis
| 
| Deron Williams (26)
| Marreese Speights (18)
| Deron Williams (11)
| Prudential Center
| 8–22
|- style="background:#fcc;"
| 31
| February 16
| @ Indiana
| 
| Danny Granger (32)
| Roy Hibbert (11)
| Paul George (5)
| Bankers Life Fieldhouse
| 8–23
|- style="background:#cfc;"
| 32
| February 18
| @ Chicago
| 
| Deron Williams (29)
| Kris Humphries (18)
| Deron Williams (8)
| United Center
| 9–23
|- style="background:#fcc;"
| 33
| February 19
| Milwaukee
| 
| Ersan İlyasova (29)
| Ersan İlyasova (25)
| Shaun Livingston (6)
| Prudential Center
| 9–24
|- style="background:#cfc;"
| 34
| February 20
| @ New York
| 
| Deron Williams (38)
| Kris Humphries (14)
| Jeremy Lin (9)
| Madison Square Garden
| 10–24
|- bgcolor=#ffcccc
| 35
| February 22
| Orlando
| 
| Marshon Brooks (24)
| Dwight Howard (17)
| Deron Williams (8)
| Prudential Center
| 10–25
|- align="center"
|colspan="9" bgcolor="#bbcaff"|All-Star Break
|- bgcolor=#ccffcc
| 36
| February 28
| @ Dallas
| 
| Brook Lopez (38)
| Kris Humphries (15)
| Deron Williams (12)
| American Airlines Center
| 11–25

|- bgcolor=#ffcccc
| 37
| March 2
| @ Boston
| 
| Brook Lopez (28)
| Kevin Garnett (10)
| Rajon Rondo (13)
| TD Garden
| 11–26
|- bgcolor=#ccffcc
| 38
| March 4
| @ Charlotte
| 
| Deron Williams (57)
| Kris Humphries (13)
| Boris Diaw (8)
| Time Warner Cable Arena
| 12–26
|- bgcolor=#ffcccc
| 39
| March 6
| @ Miami
| 
| Deron Williams (16)
| Johan Petro (8)
| Deron Williams (4)
| American Airlines Arena19,600
| 12–27
|- bgcolor=#ccffcc
| 40
| March 7
| L. A. Clippers
| 
| Deron Williams (21)
| Kris Humphries (11)
| Deron Williams (10)
| Prudential Center18,711
| 13–27
|- bgcolor=#ccffcc
| 41
| March 9
| @ Charlotte
| 
| Kris Humphries (20)
| Kris Humphries (15)
| Jordan Farmar (7)
| Time Warner Cable Arena14,672
| 14–27
|- bgcolor=#ffcccc
| 42
| March 10
| Houston
| 
| Gerald Green (26)
| Johan Petro (9)
| MarShon Brooks (7)
| Prudential Center14,834
| 14–28
|- bgcolor=#ffcccc
| 43
| March 12
| Milwaukee
| 
| Kris Humphries (31)
| Kris Humphries (18)
| Jordan Farmar (7)
| Prudential Center12,930
| 14–29
|- bgcolor=#ccffcc
| 44
| March 14
| Toronto
| 
| Gerald Green (26)
| Kris Humphries (21)
| Marshon Brooks (5)
| Prudential Center10,701
| 15–29
|- bgcolor=#ffcccc
| 45
| March 16
| @ Orlando
| 
| Dwight Howard (18)
| Ryan Anderson (11)
| Jameer Nelson (6)
| Amway Center18,938
| 15–30
|- bgcolor=#ffccc
| 46
| March 17
| New Orleans
| 
| Chris Kaman (20)
| Kris Humphries (16)
| Deron Williams (12)
| Prudential Center11,271
| 15–31
|- bgcolor=#ffccc
| 47
| March 19
| Cleveland
| 
| Deron Williams (28)
| Antawn Jamison (13)
| Deron Williams (8)
| Prudential Center11,254
| 15–32
|- bgcolor=#ffccc
| 48
| March 21
| Washington
| 
| Jordan Crawford (23)
| Kris Humphries (16)
| John Wall (8)
| Prudential Center10,097
| 15–33
|- bgcolor=#ffccc
| 49
| March 23
| @ Atlanta
| 
| Josh Smith (30)
| Josh Smith (12)
| Deron Williams (8)
| Philips Arena14,129
| 15–34
|- bgcolor=#ccffcc
| 50
| March 24
| Charlotte
| 
| Kris Humphries (20)
| Kris Humphries (16)
| Deron Williams (14)
| Prudential Center13,297
| 16–34
|- bgcolor=#ffccc
| 51
| March 26
| Utah
| 
| Paul Millsap (24)
| Paul Millsap (13)
| Devin Harris (11)
| Prudential Center10,310
| 16–35
|- bgcolor=#ccffcc
| 52
| March 28
| Indiana
| 
| Deron Williams (30)
| Kris Humphries (8)
| Deron Williams (9)
| Prudential Center10,817
| 17–35
|- bgcolor=#ccffcc
| 53
| March 30
| @ Golden State
| 
| Gerald Wallace (24)
| Gerald Wallace (18)
| Deron Williams (20)
| Oracle Arena19,596
| 18–35
|- bgcolor=#ccffcc
| 54
| March 31
| @ Sacramento
| 
| Anthony Morrow (24)
| Kris Humphries (12)
| Deron Williams (15)
| Power Balance Pavilion14,370
| 19–35

|- bgcolor=#ffccc
| 55
| April 3
| @ L. A. Lakers
| 
| Deron Williams (20)
| Kris Humphries (15)
| Deron Williams (6)
| Staples Center18,997
| 19–36
|- bgcolor=#ffccc
| 56
| April 4
| @ Portland
| 
| Kris Humphries (21)
| Kris Humphries (11)
| MarShon Brooks (6)
| Rose Garden20,464
| 19–37
|- bgcolor=#ccffcc
| 57
| April 6
| Washington
| 
| Gerald WallaceDeron Williams (19)
| Kris Humphries (12)
| Deron Williams (13)
| Prudential Center12,783
| 20–37
|- bgcolor=#ccffcc
| 58
| April 8
| Cleveland
| 
| Gerald Green (32)
| Kris Humphries (11)
| Deron Williams (10)
| Prudential Center11,341
| 21–37
|- bgcolor=#ffccc
| 59
| April 10
| Philadelphia
| 
| Kris Humphries (20)
| Kris Humphries (10)
| Deron Williams (5)
| Prudential Center15,376
| 21–38
|- bgcolor=#ccffcc
| 60
| April 13
| @ Philadelphia
| 
| Johan Petro (23)
| Kris Humphries (13)
| Deron Williams (10)
| Wells Fargo Center19,169
| 22–38
|- bgcolor=#ffccc
| 61
| April 14
| Boston
| 
| Gerald Green (15)
| Jordan Williams (14)
| Deron Williams (14)
| Prudential Center18,711
| 22–39
|- bgcolor=#ffccc
| 62
| April 16
| Miami
| 
| Kris Humphries (29)
| Kris Humphries (8)
| Sundiata Gaines (7)
| Prudential Center18,711
| 22–40
|- bgcolor=#ffccc
| 63
| April 18
| New York
| 
| Gerald Wallace (21)
| Kris Humphries (15)
| Sundiata Gaines (6)
| Prudential Center18,711
| 22–41
|- bgcolor=#ffccc
| 64
| April 21
| @ Milwaukee
| 
| Gerald Wallace (18)
| Gerald Wallace (11)
| Gerald Wallace (4)
| Bradley Center15,939
| 22–42
|- bgcolor=#ffccc
| 65
| April 23
| Philadelphia
| 
| MarShon Brooks (18)
| Kris Humphries (12)
| MarShon BrooksGerald Wallace (4)
| Prudential Center18,711
| 22–43
|- bgcolor=#ffccc
| 66
| April 26
| @ Toronto
| 
| Armon JohnsonAnthony Morrow (11)
| Johan Petro (12)
| Armon Johnson (5)
| Air Canada Centre18,161
| 22–44

Player statistics

Season

|-style="text-align:center"
|
| 5 || 1 || 18.8 || .381 || .250 || .400 || 2.2 || .6 || .4 || .0 || 4.2
|-style="text-align:center"
|
| 56 || 47 || 29.4 || .428 || .313 || .764 || 3.6 || 2.3 || .9 || .3 || 12.6
|-style="text-align:center"
|
| 6 || 0 || 7.5 || style=";"|.571 || .000 || .625 || 1.0 || 0.2 || .3 || .2 || 2.2
|-style="text-align:center"
|
| 39 || 5 || 21.3 || .467 || .440 || .905 || 1.6 || 3.3 || .6 || .1 || 10.4
|-style="text-align:center"
|
| 57 || 12 || 13.9 || .376 || .341 || .615 || 1.9 || 2.2 || 1.0 || .0 || 5.1
|-style="text-align:center"
|
| 31 || 2 || 25.2 || .481 || .391 || .754 || 3.5 || 1.1 || .9 || .5 || 12.9
|-style="text-align:center"
|
| 8 || 0 || 2.8 || .250 || .000 || .750 || .6 || .0 || .0 || .0 || .6
|-style="text-align:center"
|
| style=";"|62 || style=";"|62 || 34.9 || .481 ||  || .752 || style=";"|11.0 || 1.5 || .8 || style=";"|1.2 || 13.8
|-style="text-align:center"
|
| 7 || 7 || 24.3 || .371 || .000 || .667 || 4.7 || .4 || 1.0 || 1.0 || 4.9
|-style="text-align:center"
|
| 8 || 0 || 14.9 || .452 || .333 || style=";"|1.000 || 1.5 || 1.4 || .5 || .0 || 5.6
|-style="text-align:center"
|
| 5 || 5 || 27.2 || .494 ||  || .625 || 3.6 || 1.2 || .2 || .8 || 19.2
|-style="text-align:center"
|
| style=";"|62 || 18 || 26.4 || .413 || .371 || .933 || 2.0 || 1.0 || .7 || .1 || 12.0
|-style="text-align:center"
|
| 17 || 14 || 26.7 || .374 || .319 || .600 || 4.8 || 1.8 || .5 || .3 || 7.6
|-style="text-align:center"
|
| 7 || 0 || 10.7 || .364 || .400 || .750 || 1.9 || .6 || .0 || .1 || 1.9
|-style="text-align:center"
|
| 59 || 10 || 15.6 || .419 || style=";"|1.000 || .838 || 3.8 || .8 || .4 || .4 || 4.2
|-style="text-align:center"
|
| 5 || 0 || 9.2 || .214 || .167 ||  || 1.4 || .8 || 1.0 || .0 || 1.4
|-style="text-align:center"
|
| 51 || 30 || 18.8 || .285 || .283 || .563 || 2.0 || .8 || .4 || .1 || 2.9
|-style="text-align:center"
|
| 16 || 16 || 35.8 || .416 || .385 || .859 || 6.8 || 3.1 || style=";"|1.4 || .7 || 15.2
|-style="text-align:center"
|
| 55 || 55 || style=";"|36.3 || .407 || .336 || .843 || 3.3 || style=";"|8.7 || 1.2 || .4 || style=";"|21.0
|-style="text-align:center"
|
| 43 || 5 || 14.8 || .507 ||  || .652 || 3.6 || .3 || .5 || .3 || 4.6
|-style="text-align:center"
|
| 25 || 6 || 20.6 || .286 || .241 || .727 || 2.7 || .6 || .4 || .4 || 4.5
|-style="text-align:center"
|
| 58 || 35 || 22.0 || .478 ||  || .731 || 6.0 || .6 || .8 || .7 || 4.6
|}
  Statistics with the New Jersey Nets.

Awards, records and milestones
 Deron Williams was selected for the 2012 NBA All-Star Game. It was his third appearance.
 On March 4 Deron Williams set a new franchise record for points scored in a game with 57 in a 104–101 win against the Charlotte Bobcats.

Injuries
 Brook Lopez had a fracture in his right foot during the pre-season that required surgery and ended up missing the first 32 games of the regular season. He returned on February 19, 2012 and played five games before twisting his right ankle, an injury that ultimately aggravated the previous one sustained before the regular season. The Nets decided to place him on the injured list for the remainder of the season.
 Shawne Williams had surgery on February to remove bone fragments from his left foot and missed the remainder of the season.
 On February 8 Keith Bogans fractured his left ankle and tore his deltoid ligament in a game against the Detroit Pistons and missed the remainder of the season.
 Damion James had surgery on his right foot and was out for the season after playing in seven games.

Transactions

Overview

Trades

Free agents

Many players signed with teams from other leagues due to the 2011 NBA lockout. FIBA allows players under NBA contracts to sign and play for teams from other leagues if the contracts have opt-out clauses that allow the players to return to the NBA if the lockout ends. The Chinese Basketball Association, however, only allows its clubs to sign foreign free agents who could play for at least the entire season.

See also
 2011–12 NBA season

References

New Jersey Nets season
New Jersey Nets seasons
New Jersey Nets
New Jersey Nets
21st century in Newark, New Jersey
Basketball in Newark, New Jersey